The Football League 2008–09 (named Coca-Cola Football League for sponsorship reasons), was the seventeenth season under its current league division format. It began in August 2008 and concluded in May 2009, with the promotion play-off finals.

The Football League is contested through three Divisions. The second division of these is League One. The winner and the runner up of League One will be automatically promoted to the Football League Championship and they will be joined by the winner of the League One playoff. The bottom four teams in the league will be relegated to the third division, League Two.

Leicester City played at this level for the first time in their history having spent all their time in the top two divisions. In the opposite direction, Hereford United made their first appearance in the third tier since 1978, after many seasons in non-league and lower-league football.

Changes from last season

From League One
Promoted to Championship
 Swansea City
 Nottingham Forest
 Doncaster Rovers

Relegated to League Two
 Bournemouth
 Gillingham
 Port Vale
 Luton Town

To League One
Relegated from Championship
 Leicester City
 Colchester United
 Scunthorpe United

Promoted from League Two
 Milton Keynes Dons
 Peterborough United
 Hereford United
 Stockport County

League table

Play-offs

Results

Top scorers
Correct as of 8 May 2009

Dubious goals panel
On 30 August 2008 Leeds drew 2–2 with Bristol Rovers. The first goal was a Jermaine Beckford shot which deflected off Steven Elliot. The goal was originally an Elliot own goal, but was later awarded to Beckford.
On 7 April 2009 Leyton Orient drew 2–2 with Leeds United. Leyton Orient's first goal was from a Sean Thornton Free Kick but it took a slight deflection from Simon Church on its way in. BBC Sport awarded the goal to Sean Thornton but it is still unclear what the final decision will be regarding the actual scorer. Church later claimed the goal and stated that he definitely got a vital touch on the ball.
On 11 April 2009 Leyton Orient beat Colchester United 2–1. Leyton Orient's second goal was credited to Jimmy Smith, but it looked to have been put over the line by Scott McGleish, but it is unclear what the decision on the goalscorer will be at present.

Key events
30 April 2009 – Stockport County are docked 10 points by the FA for entering administration

Stadiums

Managerial changes

References 

 
EFL League One seasons
2008–09 Football League
3
Eng